The Sawiris family is an Egyptian Coptic Christian family that owns the Orascom conglomerate, spanning telecommunications, construction, tourism, industries and technology. In 2008, Forbes estimated the family's net worth at US$36 billion.

Onsi Sawiris (1930–2021) was the patriarch of the family.
Various companies in the group are run by Onsi Sawiris' three sons:
Naguib Sawiris (born in 1954)
Samih Sawiris (born in 1957)
Nassef Sawiris (born in 1961)

Onsi Sawiris founded Orascom in 1950 that has grown into a conglomerate of companies including Orascom Telecom Holding, and Orascom Technology Solutions (OTS), both run by Naguib Sawiris, Orascom Construction Industries (OCI) run by Nassef Sawiris, Orascom Hotels and Development (OHD) run by Samih Sawiris.

Naguib Sawiris is an investor in Mobinil, Egypt's main mobile phone company, and has expanded into Algeria, Tunisia, Pakistan, Bangladesh and even North Korea. He has also invested through affiliates in Italy (through Wind Telecomunicazioni SpA and Canada (through Globalive Wireless and its Wind Mobile). Naguib Sawiris is also investor in a highly influential Egyptian independent newspaper Almasry Alyoum and the owner of TV interests, most notably in OTV (Orascom Television).

On 20 July 2018, it was announced that Nassef Sawiris was to become a major shareholder of historic English football club Aston Villa F.C., through the investment group, NSWE, formed with U.S. billionaire, Wesley Edens.

The Sawiris family also actively engages in charity and economic and social development through Sawiris Foundation for Social Development that includes Sawiris Foundation Awards for Egyptian Literature.

References

 
Egyptian billionaires
Egyptian people of Coptic descent
Living people
Egyptian business families
Year of birth missing (living people)